Aman, Aman is the fourth studio album of Montenegrin singer Šako Polumenta, which was released in 1999.

Track listing 
The album contains eight songs plus four bonus tracks.

 Aman, Aman
 Crna ptica
 Ne zaboravi ko si i šta si
 Nekad si moja bila
 Sviđaš mi se, sviđaš
 Video te nisam dugo
 Rodi mi sinove
 Dete ulice
 U ljubavi svi su grešni (bonus)
 Pod sjajem ružičastih zvezda (bonus)
 Moje ruke tvoje traže (bonus)
 Nekad si ljubav, nekad greh (bonus)

1999 albums
Šako Polumenta albums
Grand Production albums